Hochstadt (previously also "Niederhochstadt") is a municipality in Südliche Weinstraße district, in Rhineland-Palatinate, western Germany.

It belongs, along with other municipalities, to the Verbandsgemeinde Offenbach an der Queich.
The town has a long history, dating back several thousands of years.
Hochstadt has just recently held its 1225 Year Celebration, from August 1–4 and August 8–11.

Johann Valentin Pressler, who was a forebear of Elvis Presley and a winegrower, emigrated from Niederhochstadt (then a village) to America in 1710.

References

Südliche Weinstraße